= Copper Kettle Canyon =

Valley in Nevada, United States

Coordinates: 39.9446359°N 118.1759706°W

Copper Kettle Canyon is a valley in the U.S. state of Nevada.

Copper Kettle Canyon was named for deposits of copper which were mined beginning in 1908.
